Bland County is a United States county located in the southwestern portion of the Commonwealth of Virginia. Like most of Southwestern Virginia, it is part of the Appalachian region.  The county seat is the unincorporated area of Bland.

Bland County was created in 1861 from parts of Wythe, Tazewell, and Giles counties in Virginia.  The new county was named in honor of Richard Bland, a Virginia statesman who served in the House of Burgesses and the Continental Congress.

As of the 2020 census, the county population was 6,270, making it the 4th least populated county in Virginia. Bland County is also one of the few counties in the United States that do not contain any incorporated municipalities.

History 

The push to create Bland County resulted from popular dissatisfaction with the distances required to travel to the various county seats in the area. The distances and the difficult mountain trails created a significant hardship for those needing to conduct legal affairs. In addition, the growing population resented paying taxes for benefits outside of the local area. This pressure eventually persuaded the Virginia General Assembly to take action to form a new county in the southwestern portion of the state.

Bland County was officially formed on March 30, 1861, from parts of Wythe, Tazewell, and Giles counties. Additional land from Giles County was added later.  The county was named after Richard Bland, a Virginia statesman and political figure who helped lead the struggle for freedom and independence from England.

Geography

Bland County lies within the Appalachian Regional Commission's definition of the Appalachian region. The county is mountainous with small river valleys running through the county.  The county lies entirely within the Ridge and Valley physiographic province.

The North Fork of the Holston River has its head waters in Bland County.

Adjacent counties
 Mercer County, West Virginia – north
 Giles County – northeast
 Pulaski County – southeast
 Wythe County – south
 Smyth County – southwest
 Tazewell County – west

National protected area
 Jefferson National Forest (part)

Major highways
  (future)

Demographics

2020 census

Note: the US Census treats Hispanic/Latino as an ethnic category. This table excludes Latinos from the racial categories and assigns them to a separate category. Hispanics/Latinos can be of any race.

2000 Census
As of the census of 2000, there were 6,871 people, 2,568 households, and 1,908 families residing in the county.  The population density was 19 people per square mile (7/km2).  There were 3,161 housing units at an average density of 9 per square mile (3/km2).  The racial makeup of the county was 94.82% White, 4.19% Black or African American, 0.09% Native American, 0.12% Asian, 0.01% Pacific Islander, 0.09% from other races, and 0.68% from two or more races.  0.47% of the population were Hispanic or Latino of any race. 37.4% were of American, 11.8% German, 11.5% English and 10.9% Irish ancestry according to Census 2000.

There were 2,568 households, out of which 28.30% had children under the age of 18 living with them, 62.40% were married couples living together, 8.70% had a female householder with no husband present, and 25.70% were non-families. 23.30% of all households were made up of individuals, and 10.30% had someone living alone who was 65 years of age or older.  The average household size was 2.43 and the average family size was 2.85.

The population distribution of Bland County is: 19.40% under the age of 18, 7.60% from 18 to 24, 30.60% from 25 to 44, 27.90% from 45 to 64, and 14.50% who were 65 years of age or older.  The median age was 40 years. For every 100 females there were 119.90 males.  For every 100 females age 18 and over, there were 121.90 males.

The median income for a household in the county was $30,397, and the median income for a family was $35,765. Males had a median income of $30,801 versus $23,380 for females. The per capita income for the county was $17,744.  12.40% of the population and 9.10% of families were below the poverty line.  Out of the total people living in poverty, 14.20% are under the age of 18 and 22.60% are 65 or older.

Government

Board of Supervisors
2022-2024
 District 1: K. Adam Kidd, Vice Chair (R)
 District 2: Stephen Kelley, (R)
 District 3: Randy Johnson, Chair (I)
 District 4: Keith Costello (R)

Constitutional officers
 Clerk of the Circuit Court: Rebecca I. Johnson (R)
 Commissioner of the Revenue: Cindy U. Wright (I)
 Commonwealth's Attorney: Patrick D. White (R)
 Sheriff: Jason Ramsey (R)
 Treasurer: John F. Goins (I)

Bland County is represented by Republican Travis Hackworth in the Virginia Senate, Republican James W. "Will" Morefield in the Virginia House of Delegates, and  Republican H. Morgan Griffith in the U.S. House of Representatives.

The county is a historically Republican county. The only Democrats who have carried it since 1910 have been Woodrow Wilson in 1912 when the Republican Party was split between William Howard Taft and Theodore Roosevelt, Franklin D. Roosevelt in each of his four elections, and Lyndon B. Johnson in 1964, all national Democratic Party landslides.

Communities

Census-designated places
 Bastian
 Bland
 Mechanicsburg
 Rocky Gap

Additional community
 Ceres

See also
 National Register of Historic Places listings in Bland County, Virginia

References

External links
 http://www.bland.org/

 
Virginia counties
1861 establishments in Virginia
Counties of Appalachia
Populated places established in 1861